Ibrahim Chaibou (born May 10, 1966) is a former association football referee from Niger and current military officer in the Niger armed forces.

Career as a referee and controversies
Chaibou gained the FIFA international badge in 1996 and continued with such distinction until his retirement in 2011. In a friendly match for the 2010 FIFA World Cup, Chaibou infamously awarded three penalties to South Africa in the game against Guatemala.

In 2011, in another friendly match between Argentina and Nigeria, Chaibou awarded two controversial penalties; one for each side and extended the match for a further twelve minutes after the mandatory time of ninety minutes.

The anti-corruption body of FIFA launched an investigation into his performances and tried to track him down but never succeeded. FIFA decided, in January 2019, to ban him for life in any football-linked activities 
and fined him £154,104 after finding him guilty of bribery and corruption, with a FIFA official saying Chaibou "was probably the most corrupt referee the game of football has seen,".

During a phone interview from his hometown of Niamey, capital of Niger, Chaibou denied the accusations and told the press that FIFA had already spoken with him and that he judged penalties to be penalties and that he did not receive bribes. However, he clarified that he had retired from the sport. After a series of questions regarding match fixing and knowing or not a certain person involved in bribery cases, Chaibou hung up the phone and did not answer any further calls from journalists.

Although FIFA has repeatedly called him to present himself for inquiry, he has never left his native country since then and has become a member of the military of Niger.

References 

Nigerien football referees
1966 births
Nigerien military personnel
People from Niamey
Living people